The Stavropol constituency (No.65) is a Russian legislative constituency in Stavropol Krai. Until 2007 the constituency covered the entire city of Stavropol and western Stavropol Krai, however, in 2015 redistricting Stavropol was split with Stavropol constituency currently occupying parts of Stavropol as well as central Stavropol Krai, which was previously in former Petrovsky constituency, while Nevinnomyssk constituency was formed from most of former Stavropol constituency's territory.

Members elected

Election results

1993

|-
! colspan=2 style="background-color:#E9E9E9;text-align:left;vertical-align:top;" |Candidate
! style="background-color:#E9E9E9;text-align:left;vertical-align:top;" |Party
! style="background-color:#E9E9E9;text-align:right;" |Votes
! style="background-color:#E9E9E9;text-align:right;" |%
|-
|style="background-color:"|
|align=left|Aleksandr Traspov
|align=left|Independent
|
|13.51%
|-
|style="background-color:#E98282"|
|align=left|Valentina Kozhukhova
|align=left|Women of Russia
| -
|12.70%
|-
| colspan="5" style="background-color:#E9E9E9;"|
|- style="font-weight:bold"
| colspan="3" style="text-align:left;" | Total
| 
| 100%
|-
| colspan="5" style="background-color:#E9E9E9;"|
|- style="font-weight:bold"
| colspan="4" |Source:
|
|}

1995

|-
! colspan=2 style="background-color:#E9E9E9;text-align:left;vertical-align:top;" |Candidate
! style="background-color:#E9E9E9;text-align:left;vertical-align:top;" |Party
! style="background-color:#E9E9E9;text-align:right;" |Votes
! style="background-color:#E9E9E9;text-align:right;" |%
|-
|style="background-color:"|
|align=left|Vasily Iver
|align=left|Communist Party
|
|22.29%
|-
|style="background-color:"|
|align=left|Andrey Razin
|align=left|Independent
|
|10.76%
|-
|style="background-color:"|
|align=left|Sergey Petrenko
|align=left|Our Home – Russia
|
|7.77%
|-
|style="background-color:#F5821F"|
|align=left|Aleksandr Kosyanov
|align=left|Bloc of Independents
|
|6.69%
|-
|style="background-color:"|
|align=left|Vasily Belchenko
|align=left|Independent
|
|5.00%
|-
|style="background-color:"|
|align=left|Viktor Khlopotnya
|align=left|Independent
|
|4.95%
|-
|style="background-color:"|
|align=left|Larisa Maksakova
|align=left|Liberal Democratic Party
|
|4.92%
|-
|style="background-color:"|
|align=left|Sergey Bystrov
|align=left|Agrarian Party
|
|4.45%
|-
|style="background-color:"|
|align=left|Dmitry Kuzmin
|align=left|Independent
|
|4.37%
|-
|style="background-color:#3A46CE"|
|align=left|Oleg Naumov
|align=left|Democratic Choice of Russia – United Democrats
|
|3.84%
|-
|style="background-color:#1C1A0D"|
|align=left|Aleksandr Traspov (incumbent)
|align=left|Forward, Russia!
|
|3.17%
|-
|style="background-color:"|
|align=left|Lyubov Yermolova
|align=left|Education — Future of Russia
|
|2.26%
|-
|style="background-color:#F21A29"|
|align=left|Anatoly Kutovenko
|align=left|Trade Unions and Industrialists – Union of Labour
|
|2.10%
|-
|style="background-color:"|
|align=left|Andrey Dudinov
|align=left|Independent
|
|1.47%
|-
|style="background-color:"|
|align=left|Grigory Ilchenko
|align=left|Independent
|
|1.34%
|-
|style="background-color:"|
|align=left|Yevgeny Ivanov
|align=left|Independent
|
|1.05%
|-
|style="background-color:"|
|align=left|Stepan Bondar
|align=left|Independent
|
|0.97%
|-
|style="background-color:"|
|align=left|Vadim Balak
|align=left|Independent
|
|0.88%
|-
|style="background-color:#0D0900"|
|align=left|Tatyana Dakhno
|align=left|People's Union
|
|0.72%
|-
|style="background-color:#019CDC"|
|align=left|Nikolay Dyadenko
|align=left|Party of Russian Unity and Accord
|
|0.71%
|-
|style="background-color:#000000"|
|colspan=2 |against all
|
|7.79%
|-
| colspan="5" style="background-color:#E9E9E9;"|
|- style="font-weight:bold"
| colspan="3" style="text-align:left;" | Total
| 
| 100%
|-
| colspan="5" style="background-color:#E9E9E9;"|
|- style="font-weight:bold"
| colspan="4" |Source:
|
|}

1999

|-
! colspan=2 style="background-color:#E9E9E9;text-align:left;vertical-align:top;" |Candidate
! style="background-color:#E9E9E9;text-align:left;vertical-align:top;" |Party
! style="background-color:#E9E9E9;text-align:right;" |Votes
! style="background-color:#E9E9E9;text-align:right;" |%
|-
|style="background-color:"|
|align=left|Vasily Iver (incumbent)
|align=left|Communist Party
|
|18.08%
|-
|style="background-color:"|
|align=left|Andrey Razin
|align=left|Independent
|
|14.38%
|-
|style="background-color:"|
|align=left|Dmitry Kuzmin
|align=left|Independent
|
|11.59%
|-
|style="background-color:"|
|align=left|Vladimir Reshetnyak
|align=left|Independent
|
|11.22%
|-
|style="background-color:#3B9EDF"|
|align=left|Yevgeny Pismenny
|align=left|Fatherland – All Russia
|
|8.30%
|-
|style="background-color:#C21022"|
|align=left|Vladimir Popov
|align=left|Party of Pensioners
|
|6.99%
|-
|style="background-color:"|
|align=left|Anatoly Korobeynikov
|align=left|Independent
|
|3.83%
|-
|style="background-color:"|
|align=left|Andrey Dudinov
|align=left|Independent
|
|3.31%
|-
|style="background-color:"|
|align=left|Vladimir Rokhmistrov
|align=left|Yabloko
|
|3.28%
|-
|style="background-color:#1042A5"|
|align=left|Sergey Popov (Safonov)
|align=left|Union of Right Forces
|
|3.17%
|-
|style="background-color:#084284"|
|align=left|Tatyana Gryadskaya
|align=left|Spiritual Heritage
|
|1.98%
|-
|style="background-color:"|
|align=left|Olga Volodina
|align=left|Independent
|
|1.23%
|-
|style="background-color:"|
|align=left|Vasily Bodrov
|align=left|Independent
|
|0.87%
|-
|style="background-color:#FF4400"|
|align=left|Vladimir Kozinets
|align=left|Andrey Nikolayev and Svyatoslav Fyodorov Bloc
|
|0.51%
|-
|style="background-color:#020266"|
|align=left|Anatoly Babich
|align=left|Russian Socialist Party
|
|0.47%
|-
|style="background-color:#C62B55"|
|align=left|Marina Godlevskaya
|align=left|Peace, Labour, May
|
|0.33%
|-
|style="background-color:#000000"|
|colspan=2 |against all
|
|8.28%
|-
| colspan="5" style="background-color:#E9E9E9;"|
|- style="font-weight:bold"
| colspan="3" style="text-align:left;" | Total
| 
| 100%
|-
| colspan="5" style="background-color:#E9E9E9;"|
|- style="font-weight:bold"
| colspan="4" |Source:
|
|}

2003

|-
! colspan=2 style="background-color:#E9E9E9;text-align:left;vertical-align:top;" |Candidate
! style="background-color:#E9E9E9;text-align:left;vertical-align:top;" |Party
! style="background-color:#E9E9E9;text-align:right;" |Votes
! style="background-color:#E9E9E9;text-align:right;" |%
|-
|style="background-color:"|
|align=left|Anatoly Semenchenko
|align=left|Independent
|
|22.35%
|-
|style="background-color:"|
|align=left|Aleksandr Kuzmin
|align=left|Independent
|
|19.47%
|-
|style="background-color:"|
|align=left|Mikhail Kuzmin
|align=left|Independent
|
|11.95%
|-
|style="background-color:"|
|align=left|Vladimir Brykalov
|align=left|Independent
|
|9.85%
|-
|style="background-color:"|
|align=left|Vasily Iver (incumbent)
|align=left|Communist Party
|
|9.00%
|-
|style="background-color:"|
|align=left|Vyacheslav Bunyatov
|align=left|Independent
|
|3.05%
|-
|style="background-color:"|
|align=left|Aleksandr Traspov
|align=left|Liberal Democratic Party
|
|2.50%
|-
|style="background-color:"|
|align=left|Yury Pankov
|align=left|Agrarian Party
|
|1.54%
|-
|style="background-color:#1042A5"|
|align=left|Tatyana Trembacheva
|align=left|Union of Right Forces
|
|1.26%
|-
|style="background-color:"|
|align=left|Boris Dyakonov
|align=left|Yabloko
|
|1.22%
|-
|style="background-color:"|
|align=left|Sergey Kharitonov
|align=left|Independent
|
|1.17%
|-
|style="background-color:"|
|align=left|Aleksandr Kozlov
|align=left|Independent
|
|1.07%
|-
|style="background-color:#004090"|
|align=left|Aleksandr Krasulya
|align=left|New Course — Automobile Russia
|
|0.56%
|-
|style="background-color:"|
|align=left|Igor Lutsenko
|align=left|Independent
|
|0.55%
|-
|style="background-color:"|
|align=left|Sergey Mun
|align=left|Independent
|
|0.26%
|-
|style="background-color:#000000"|
|colspan=2 |against all
|
|12.65%
|-
| colspan="5" style="background-color:#E9E9E9;"|
|- style="font-weight:bold"
| colspan="3" style="text-align:left;" | Total
| 
| 100%
|-
| colspan="5" style="background-color:#E9E9E9;"|
|- style="font-weight:bold"
| colspan="4" |Source:
|
|}

2016

|-
! colspan=2 style="background-color:#E9E9E9;text-align:left;vertical-align:top;" |Candidate
! style="background-color:#E9E9E9;text-align:left;vertical-align:top;" |Party
! style="background-color:#E9E9E9;text-align:right;" |Votes
! style="background-color:#E9E9E9;text-align:right;" |%
|-
|style="background-color: " |
|align=left|Mikhail Kuzmin
|align=left|United Russia
|
|49.62%
|-
|style="background-color:"|
|align=left|Olga Drozdova
|align=left|Liberal Democratic Party
|
|15.71%
|-
|style="background-color:"|
|align=left|Viktor Sobolev
|align=left|Communist Party
|
|10.00%
|-
|style="background-color:"|
|align=left|Aleksandr Kuzmin
|align=left|A Just Russia
|
|7.78%
|-
|style="background:"| 
|align=left|Yury Rukosuyev
|align=left|Communists of Russia
|
|3.58%
|-
|style="background-color:"|
|align=left|Vasily Avdeyev
|align=left|The Greens
|
|2.31%
|-
|style="background-color: "|
|align=left|Nikolay Sasin
|align=left|Party of Growth
|
|1.94%
|-
|style="background-color: "|
|align=left|Sergey Kulagin
|align=left|Patriots of Russia
|
|1.57%
|-
|style="background:"| 
|align=left|Pavel Lebedev
|align=left|People's Freedom Party
|
|1.38%
|-
|style="background-color:"|
|align=left|Yevgeny Mokhov
|align=left|Rodina
|
|1.31%
|-
| colspan="5" style="background-color:#E9E9E9;"|
|- style="font-weight:bold"
| colspan="3" style="text-align:left;" | Total
| 
| 100%
|-
| colspan="5" style="background-color:#E9E9E9;"|
|- style="font-weight:bold"
| colspan="4" |Source:
|
|}

2021

|-
! colspan=2 style="background-color:#E9E9E9;text-align:left;vertical-align:top;" |Candidate
! style="background-color:#E9E9E9;text-align:left;vertical-align:top;" |Party
! style="background-color:#E9E9E9;text-align:right;" |Votes
! style="background-color:#E9E9E9;text-align:right;" |%
|-
|style="background-color: " |
|align=left|Mikhail Kuzmin (incumbent)
|align=left|United Russia
|
|56.65%
|-
|style="background-color:"|
|align=left|Viktor Goncharov
|align=left|Communist Party
|
|13.01%
|-
|style="background-color:"|
|align=left|Aleksandr Kuzmin
|align=left|A Just Russia — For Truth
|
|11.63%
|-
|style="background:"| 
|align=left|Sergey Vorobyev
|align=left|Communists of Russia
|
|4.26%
|-
|style="background-color:"|
|align=left|Dmitry Pastyrev
|align=left|Liberal Democratic Party
|
|3.23%
|-
|style="background-color: "|
|align=left|Ivan Ivannikov
|align=left|Party of Pensioners
|
|2.83%
|-
|style="background-color: " |
|align=left|Boris Mitrofansky
|align=left|New People
|
|2.48%
|-
|style="background-color: "|
|align=left|Aleksey Antonov
|align=left|Party of Growth
|
|2.02%
|-
|style="background-color:"|
|align=left|Mikhail Seredenko
|align=left|Rodina
|
|1.09%
|-
| colspan="5" style="background-color:#E9E9E9;"|
|- style="font-weight:bold"
| colspan="3" style="text-align:left;" | Total
| 
| 100%
|-
| colspan="5" style="background-color:#E9E9E9;"|
|- style="font-weight:bold"
| colspan="4" |Source:
|
|}

Notes

References

Russian legislative constituencies
Politics of Stavropol Krai